Tuora-Kyuyol (Tuora Küöl) is a rural locality (a selo), the only inhabited locality, and the administrative center of Khayakhsytsky Rural Okrug of Churapchinsky District in the Sakha Republic, Russia, located  from Churapcha, the administrative center of the district. Its population as of the 2010 Census was 553, down from 633 recorded during the 2002 Census.

References

Notes

Sources
Official website of the Sakha Republic. Registry of the Administrative-Territorial Divisions of the Sakha Republic. Churapchinsky District. 

Rural localities in Churapchinsky District